Bergama Belediyespor is a football club located in Bergama, Turkey.

Previous names 
 Bergamaspor (1970–1998)
 Bergama Belediyespor (1998–present)

League participations 
TFF Second League: 1995–1996
TFF Third League: 1984–1995, 1996–2003, 2012–present
Turkish Regional Amateur League: 2011–2012

Stadium 
Currently the team plays at the 2,000-seat capacity 14 Eylül Stadyumu.

Current squad

References

External links 
Bergama Belediyespor on TFF.org

TFF Third League clubs
Football clubs in Turkey
Sports teams in İzmir